The Black Rapids Roadhouse, also known as the Rapids Roadhouse and the Rapids Hunting Lodge, is a historic Alaskan structure along the Richardson Highway in east-central Alaska. It was built in 1902. Construction of the Alaska Railroad led to a decline in the 1920s, but the original roadhouse continued to operate until 1993. A new, modern lodge was built near the roadhouse in 2001 and the original building is preserved as a historical curiosity and tourist attraction.

The original roadhouse was listed on the National Register of Historic Places in 2001.

Black Rapids Glacier
Black Rapids Roadhouse is across the Delta River from the Black Rapids Glacier. For three months in 1937 the Black Rapids Glacier made national news by advancing across the valley at the rate of a mile a month-it was known as the "galloping glacier."

History
The Rapids Roadhouse, variously known as Black Rapids Roadhouse or Rapids Hunting Lodge, opened at least by 1904 to serve travelers on the new Valdez-Fairbanks Trail. Of more than thirty roadhouses that operated along the route between 1902 and 1923, Rapids Roadhouse is one of the few that survive.
Rapids Roadhouse continued to operate until 1993, although its peak years had been during the first decades of the 20th century. Because of this, period of significance ended in 1923.

See also
National Register of Historic Places listings in Southeast Fairbanks Census Area, Alaska

References

External links
 Lodge at Black Rapids

1902 establishments in Alaska
1904 establishments in Alaska
1993 disestablishments in Alaska
Commercial buildings completed in 1902
Restaurants established in 1904
Restaurants disestablished in 1993
Buildings and structures in Southeast Fairbanks Census Area, Alaska
Commercial buildings on the National Register of Historic Places in Alaska
Restaurants in Alaska
Defunct restaurants in the United States
Buildings and structures on the National Register of Historic Places in Southeast Fairbanks Census Area, Alaska
Restaurants on the National Register of Historic Places